The Great New Wonderful is a 2005 American comedy-drama film written by Sam Catlin and directed by Danny Leiner. It stars Naseeruddin Shah, Tony Shalhoub, Jim Gaffigan, Maggie Gyllenhaal and Olympia Dukakis, and tells the tales of several New Yorkers a year after the September 11, 2001 terrorist attacks. The film premiered on April 22, 2005 at the Tribeca Film Festival and was released in the United States on June 26, 2006.

Plot
The Great New Wonderful is a series of vignettes of incidents taking place concurrently around Manhattan. The only other thing linking the incidents is the month in which they occur: September 2002. Recurring themes include frustration and sugar.

The vignettes include:

 An accountant (Jim Gaffigan) undergoing a therapy session in the office of a passive-aggressive psychologist (Tony Shalhoub).
 Two immigrants from India on security detail for a visiting dignitary.
 An ambitious pastry chef (Maggie Gyllenhaal) preparing a professional pitch that she hopes will make her the reigning doyenne of New York's competitive cake scene.
 A Brooklyn housewife (Olympia Dukakis) fixes her husband's dinner and then sits at the kitchen table making collages out of old magazines while her husband sits on the balcony, smoking a cigarette.
 Allison & David Burbage (Judy Greer, Tom McCarthy) struggle to keep their marriage together while coping with their increasingly difficult and strangely self-possessed 10-year-old son.

Cast
 Olympia Dukakis — Judy Hillerman
 Jim Gaffigan — Sandie
 Judy Greer — Allison Burbage
 Maggie Gyllenhaal — Emme Keeler
 Tom McCarthy — David Burbage
 Sharat Saxena — Satish
 Naseeruddin Shah — Avi
 Tony Shalhoub — Dr. Trabulous
 Edie Falco — Safarah Polsky
 Stephen Colbert — Mr. Peersall
 Jim Parsons — Justin
 Seth Gilliam – Clayton
 Will Arnett – Danny Keeler
 Tony Kushner – Himself
 Ari Graynor – Lisa Krindel
 Julie Dretzin – Julie Driscoll
 Rosemarie DeWitt – Debbie
 Tonye Patano – Shirley
 Alex McCord – Jessilyn
 Dick Latessa – Jerry Binder
 Sam Catlin – Councilman Blenick
 Marilyn Chris – Phyllis
 Anita Gillette – Lainie
 David Costabile – Vending Machine Guy
 Meredith Ostrom – Anita

Reception
On review aggregator Rotten Tomatoes, the film has an approval rating of 73% based on 41 reviews, and an average rating of 6.7/10. The website's critical consensus reads, "Set in post-9/11 New York, this largely evocative dramedy interweaves the stories of five disconnected individuals who share an unspoken emotional malaise that shadows their attempts at returning to normal life." On Metacritic, the film has a weighted average score of 57 out of 100, based on 14 critics, indicating "mixed or average reviews".

References

External links
 Scott, A.O. (2006, June 23). Everything Is Different, but Life Goes On Anyway. The New York Times, p. B12
 
 
 

2005 films
2005 comedy-drama films
American comedy-drama films
Films directed by Danny Leiner
Films scored by John Swihart
Films set in 2002
Films set in New York City
Films based on the September 11 attacks
2000s English-language films
2000s American films